Riomaggiore (locally ) is a village and commune in the province of La Spezia, situated in a small valley in the Liguria region of Italy. It is the first of the Cinque Terre one meets when travelling north from La Spezia. 

The village, dating from the early thirteenth century, is known for its historic character and wine produced by the town's vineyards. Riomaggiore is in the Riviera di Levante region. It has a shoreline on the Mediterranean's Gulf of Genoa, with a small beach and a wharf framed by tower houses. Riomaggiore's main street is Via Colombo, where numerous restaurants, bars, and shops can be found.

The Via dell'Amore is a path connecting Riomaggiore to its frazione Manarola, also part of the Cinque Terre.

Riomaggiore is the most southern village of the five Cinque Terre, all connected by trail. The water and mountainside have been declared national parks.

Riomaggiore inspired paintings by Telemaco Signorini (1835–1901), one of the artists of the Macchiaioli group.

Transportation 
Riomaggiore railway station is on the Genoa–Pisa railway.

Inside Riomaggiore, all major attractions are walkable for tourists.

In popular culture
Riomaggiore was featured in the 2014 driving video game Forza Horizon 2. The village was not featured as the central location but was referenced on various road signs.

Riomaggiore and other Cinque Terre towns were the inspiration for the fictional Portorosso in the 2021 animated film Luca.

Gallery

See also
Liguria wine

References

External links 
 Welcome to Italy: Riomaggiore
 Virtual tour, Riomaggiore
Homepage of the City

Coastal towns in Liguria
Italian Riviera
World Heritage Sites in Italy